Menachem Creditor is an American rabbi, author, and musician. He is the Pearl and Ira Meyer Scholar-in-Residence at UJA-Federation New York and founder of Rabbis Against Gun Violence. His work has appeared in the Times of Israel, the Huffington Post, the Jewish Week, the Jewish Daily Forward, and the Wall Street Journal.

Career

A frequent speaker at synagogues, college campuses, and communities on questions of Identity, Leadership, Activism and Spirituality, Rabbi Creditor was named by Newsweek as one of the 50 Most Influential Rabbis in America.

Creditor served as assistant rabbi at Temple Israel in Sharon, Massachusetts from 2002 to 2007 and as rabbi of Congregation Netivot Shalom in Berkeley, California from 2007 to 2018. From 2013 - 2018 he was a frequent contributor to the Huffington Post. In 2018 he was named Pearl and Ira Meyer Scholar-in-Residence of UJA-Federation of New York.

Activism

In August 2012, Creditor traveled to Ghana, Africa, with American Jewish World Service, and has since become increasingly vocal on issues such as global slavery and urban gun violence, partnering with national faith-based organizing groups such as the PICO Network and Bend the Arc: A Jewish Partnership for Justice. He has twice been invited as an American faith leader to the White House, presenting "A Prophetic Response to Gun Violence" and the PICO interfaith "Healing the Soul of America from Gun Violence" statement As an outcome of the clergy gathering, Creditor edited and published a collection of rabbinic voices as "Peace in Our Cities: Rabbis Against Gun Violence." The book, now in its second printing, has been distributed to congressional leaders, and Creditor's contemporary Prayer to end Gun Violence has been distributed by interfaith organizations around the United States.

In August 2014, he edited and published in less than two days a collection entitled "The Hope: American Jewish Voices in Support of Israel"Steve Lipman, "Rabbi Pens Book On Israel/Gaza Conflict In 36 Hours", New York Jewish Week, August 15, 2014. in solidarity with Israel during attacks from Hamas in Gaza. From 2014 - 2017, Rabbi Creditor led the Progressive Rabbinic Mission to Israel through AIEF, AIPAC's educational foundation.

In March 2016, Creditor helped lead a rabbinic walk-out during the AIPAC Policy Conference in Washington, D.C. when Donald Trump took the stage. Then, following Trump's speech, Creditor addressed the 18,000 conference attendees calling upon them to reject "the politics of hate"

Following the Orlando nightclub shooting, Creditor edited a rapid-response book, "Not by Might: Channeling the Power of Faith to End Gun Violence," including 62 faith leaders as contributors and a foreword by Shannon Watts, founder of Moms Demand Action.

On October 27, 2018, after a domestic terrorist murdered 11 worshipers in a mass shooting at Tree of Life Synagogue, Rabbi Creditor spoke alongside Mayor Bill de Blasio, Cardinal Timonthy M. Dolan, and other New York faith and elected leaders. Two months later, he published "Holding Fast: Jews Respond to American Gun Violence," a collection of teens, rabbis, and others from the Tree of Life community and beyond, calling as Jews for an end to American Gun Violence.

In 2022, Rabbi Creditor published an anthology of his own writings on American Gun Violence, entitled "Ending Gun Violence" (2022) with a foreword by Fred Guttenberg, an American Gun Violence activist whose daughter Jaime was murdered in the 2018 Stoneman Douglas High School shooting.

Political protests

Creditor has been described as "one of the most outspoken, activist rabbis, speaking and organizing on behalf of a range of progressive causes", "a vocal proponent of gay and women’s rights" and "a leading advocate of gay ordination."

Creditor was politically active during 2016 American Presidential campaign, calling upon the American Jewish Community to reject the candidacy of Trump. Upon Trump's election, Rabbi Creditor collaborated with Rabbi David Paskin and released a compilation album entitled "There is Hope," featuring the leading voices in American Jewish music and available for free download. The album was designed to support "anyone in need of reassurance and comfort in these uncertain times.". In February 2017 Creditor also compiled and published a written collection of Jewish voices in opposition to Trump's election, entitled "We Will Not Be Silent."

On February 6, 2017, Creditor was one of 19 American Rabbis arrested at a protest of President Donald Trump's refugee ban in front of the Trump International Hotel in New York City.

Religious activism

Creditor first received national attention for his controversial 2005 speech at the biennial conference of the Conservative Movement, urging the expulsion of non-egalitarian congregations from the movement.  He was a co-founder of ShefaNetwork: The Conservative/Masorti Movement Dreaming from Within, co-founder of KeshetRabbis: The Alliance of Gay-Friendly Conservative/Masorti Rabbis, and was the founding International Co-Chair of Rabbis for Women of the Wall. Rabbi Creditor appeared as a "central figure" in Josh Kornbluth's 2010 monologue Andy Warhol: Good for the Jews? and Kornbluth's 2013 monologue Sea of Reeds He has served as a Trustee of American Jewish World Service (AJWS), as co-chair of the Rabbinic advisory board of Shalom Bayyit, and is the former chair of The Masorti Center.

Publications

Among his 30 books and 6 albums of original Jewish music are "A Year of Torah" (2021), “And Yet We Love: Poems” (2016) with a foreword by Ruth Messinger(Global Ambassador for American Jewish World Service), and “Olam Chesed Yibaneh/A World of Love” (2002), considered a modern "Jewish anthem". He has published a transliterated Shabbat prayerbook "Tov LeHodot", and the children's books "A Pesach Rhyme" and "Avodah: A Yom Kippur Story." During the COVID-19 Pandemic, he co-edited with Sarah Tuttle-Singer a two-volume collection of reflections, poems, and prayers with contributions from hundreds of authors in response to COVID-19, entitled "When We Turned Within." Following the January 6, 2021 storming of the United States Capitol, Creditor published a rapid-response collection of rabbinic responses to the Insurrection entitled "Remember and Do Not Forget," co-edited with Rabbi Jesse Olitzky.

Personal life
In November 2017, Creditor became engaged to singer Neshama Carlebach. They married in August 2018. They have 5 children.

References

External links
Rabbi Menachem Creditor Official website

American Conservative rabbis
Year of birth missing (living people)
Living people
Place of birth missing (living people)
Jewish Theological Seminary of America semikhah recipients
American LGBT rights activists
21st-century American rabbis
Jewish American activists
American gun control activists